Gemmula vagata is a species of sea snail, a marine gastropod mollusk in the family Turridae, the turrids.

Description
The length of the shell varies between 60 mm and 65 mm.

The tall and narrow fusiform shell is white with the infrasutural keel somewhat reddish. The spire is elongate and acuminate with almost vertical sides. It contains 12 whorls, showing a moderately strong subsutural square-cut fold. The concave shoulder shows 5 to 9 spiral threads. It is strongly gemmate with about 24 gemmules on the penultimate whorl. The aperture with the siphonal canal measures almost half the total length. The interior of the aperture is white. The outer lip is narrow and slightly incised. The columella stands upright and is slightly askew. The siphonal canal is elongate, narrow and slightly recurved.

Distribution
This species occurs in deep water in the Indian Ocean from Aden to Andaman Islands and off Sri Lanka

References

External links
  Tucker, J.K. 2004 Catalog of recent and fossil turrids (Mollusca: Gastropoda). Zootaxa 682:1-1295.
 Gastropods.com: Gemmula (Gemmula) vagata

vagata
Gastropods described in 1895